Taylor Burton Coppenrath (born November 8, 1981) is an American former professional basketball player.

Early life

Coppenrath went to high school at St. Johnsbury Academy where he did not play for the varsity basketball team until his junior year. However, he went on to be the 2000 Vermont Player of the Year by Gatorade, the Burlington Free Press and USA Today.

College career

Coppenrath played at University of Vermont from 2001 to 2005. After his redshirt freshman year, he led UVM to three straight America East Conference titles. At the end of his college career, he was Vermont's second all-time leading scorer in total points (2,442) and points per game (21.4). He also ranks the university's all-time leader in field goals made (851), is fifth all-time in rebounding (839) and blocked shots (83). He is one of two players along with Reggie Lewis, to win three America East Conference Player of the Year awards. Coppenrath also matched a record held by Vin Baker with 14 America East Player of the Week awards.

During his junior year, Coppenrath and the Catamounts were in contention for the America East regular season championship when he discovered that his wrist was broken following a loss to Boston University. BU went on to win the regular season crown, but Coppenrath led Vermont over Maine in the conference title game to send UVM to the NCAA tournament. The title game, which was held at UVM's Patrick Gym and televised nationally, was Coppenrath's first game back from the wrist injury. Playing with his wrist wrapped, Coppenrath delivered a 43-point performance and captured the Reggie Lewis Award as the most outstanding player of the conference tournament despite playing only one game in the tourney.

In his senior year, Coppenrath was a finalist for many national awards, including the John Wooden Award for National Player of the Year, the only finalist ever from the America East. That season (2004–2005) was the most successful in Vermont men's basketball history. After capturing the Conference title, the team defeated Syracuse University for its first NCAA tournament victory ever. Coppenrath scored 16 points in the game.

On October 26, 2019, Coppenrath’s number 22 jersey was retired by the University of Vermont, on the same night former teammate T. J. Sorrentine’s number 11 was also retired.

Professional career
After playing with the Boston Celtics Summer League team in 2005, Coppenrath signed with AEK Athens B.C. in Greece for the 2005–06 season. After completing his first season abroad, he played with the Indiana Pacers during Summer League before signing with Pallacanestro Biella in Italian Serie A.

In 2007, Coppenrath signed with CB Lucentum Alicante in the Spanish LEB Oro, where he stayed from 2007 to 2009. It was in Spain where the forward has played the rest of his career thus far, with both  Melilla Baloncesto in 2009–10, CB Murcia in 2010–11, Menorca Bàsquet in 2011–12, returning to Alicante for the 2012–13 season, where he again helped the team earn promotion to Liga ACB. For the 2013–14 season, Coppenrath signed with Ford Burgos., where he was selected in the All-LEB Oro Team after the 2014–15 season.

In August 2015, Coppenrath announced his retirement after helping teams achieve five promotions to Liga ACB in six seasons.

Coaching career
Coppenrath returned to his alma mater, St. Johnsbury Academy where he served as an assistant coach for the boys' basketball team in addition to teaching math. On July 26, 2017, Coppenrath was announced as the head girls basketball coach at Missisquoi Valley Union Middle/High School in Swanton, Vermont, where he will also serve as a math teacher.

Euroleague statistics

|-
| style="text-align:left;"| 2005–06
| style="text-align:left;"| AEK Athens
| 13 || 13 || 28.6 || .495 || .000 || .789 || 3.6 || .5 || 1.0 || .4 || 11.1 || 10.9
|- class="sortbottom"
| style="text-align:left;"| Career
| style="text-align:left;"|
| 13 || 13 || 28.6 || .495 || .000 || .789 || 3.6 || .5 || 1.0 || .4 || 11.1 || 10.9
|}

References

External links
 LEB Oro profile
  Official site
  Univ. of Vermont basketball bio
 stats @ aek.com

1981 births
Living people
AEK B.C. players
American expatriate basketball people in Greece
American expatriate basketball people in Italy
American expatriate basketball people in Spain
American men's basketball players
Basketball players from Vermont
CB Lucentum Alicante players
CB Murcia players
Melilla Baloncesto players
Menorca Bàsquet players
Pallacanestro Biella players
People from Barnet, Vermont
Power forwards (basketball)
St. Johnsbury Academy alumni
Vermont Catamounts men's basketball players